The Stade Louis-II, also known as Louis II is a stadium located in the Fontvieille district of Monaco. It serves primarily as a venue for football, being the home of AS Monaco and the Monaco national football team. The stadium is most notable for its distinctive nine arches at the away end of the ground. The arena is also used for the Herculis, a track and field meet of the Diamond League. The stadium hosted the 1986 and 1998–2012 UEFA Super Cup matches. Due to Monaco's small size, the stadium is the only football and athletics stadium in the country.

History
The original Stade Louis II was opened in 1939 as the home of AS Monaco. The decision to build a new sports centre in Monaco dates back to 1979. Prince Rainier III decided to establish a sports area in the Fontvieille district. The prince brought in Parisian architects to build the complex. The work began in May 1981 and ended in 1984, and required 120,000 m³ of concrete, 9,000 tonnes of iron and 2,000 tonnes of steel structure on a median land reclaimed from the sea. The complex was inaugurated on 25 January 1985 by Rainier III.

The stadium has a current seating capacity of 16,360, and is named after Louis II, Prince of Monaco, who was the Sovereign Prince of Monaco when the original stadium was built. The vast majority of the stadium's facilities are located underground, including the Gaston-Médecin multi-sports centre, the Prince Albert II aquatic centre and a large car park directly under the pitch.

The stadium has hosted major professional boxing world title fights from time to time; those include the Julio César Chávez, Sr. versus Rocky Lockridge contest.

Facilities
The Salle Gaston Médecin indoor arena is located under the stands of the football stadium. Salle Gaston Médecin is able to host basketball, volleyball, and handball games, as well as judo and fencing matches, and weightlifting and gymnastics competitions. It has a seating capacity of 3,000 people for basketball games, and 3,700 people for concerts.

The stadium complex, besides the football stadium and athletics track and the Salle Gaston Médecin, also contains the aquatic centre Prince Albert II, a large office complex, and also houses the International University of Monaco (IUM), which specializes in business education.

Gallery

See also
 Geography of Monaco

References

External links

 Stade Louis II
 Presentation Stade Louis II

Stade Louis II
Diamond League venues
Fontvieille, Monaco
Sports venues in Monaco
Football venues in Monaco
Athletics (track and field) venues in Monaco
National stadiums
Sports venues completed in 1939
Stade Louis II